Winter Park High School (often simply abbreviated as WPHS) located in Winter Park, Florida, United States is one of nineteen public high schools in Orange County. Winter Park High School is a International Baccalaureate school and delivers Advanced Placement courses.

History
Winter Park High School was constructed at 528 Huntington Avenue in 1923 and was one of the first high schools in Orange County. The school remained in this location until construction began in 1969 at the present location (2100 Summerfield Road). The original campus remains in use to this day as the Winter Park High School Ninth Grade Center, a campus exclusively used by ninth-grade students.

Athletics
The following sports are offered at Winter Park:

Athletic Training
Baseball
Basketball
Bowling
Cheerleading
Crew
Cross country running
Flag football
Football
Golf
Lacrosse
Quiz Bowl
Soccer
Softball
Special Olympics
Swimming
Tennis
Track and field
Volleyball
Water polo
Weightlifting
Wrestling

Notable alumni
 
Rafael Araujo-Lopes – American football player
Amanda Bearse – actress
Jack Billingham – baseball player (MLB)
Torrey DeVitto – actress
Thomas Dodd (artist) – Digital artist and photographer
George Eddy – American-French basketball commentator and professional basketball player
Billy Gardell (1987) – comedian and actor (star of Mike & Molly)
Hank Green (1998) – videoblogger and entrepreneur
Katelin Guregian ( Snyder) – Olympic gold medalist for the United States in rowing
John Hart – baseball executive (MLB)
Davey Johnson – baseball player and manager (MLB)
Arielle Kebbel – actress
Kostya Kimlat - magician
Kilo Kish – American rapper and visual artist
Beth Littleford – comedian and actress
Dax McCarty – soccer player, Nashville SC – attended Winter Park from 2001 to 2003
Paul McGowan – football player (1987 Butkus Award Winner)
Bret Munsey – football coach (Arena)
Jo Ann Pflug (1958) – actress
Stan Pietkiewicz – basketball player (NBA)
Wes Platt (1984) – journalist and computer game designer
Austin Rivers – basketball player, Minnesota Timberwolves (NBA)
Jeremiah Rivers – basketball player
Ben Rock - filmmaker

References

External links

Educational institutions established in 1927
1927 establishments in Florida
Orange County Public Schools
High schools in Orange County, Florida
Buildings and structures in Winter Park, Florida
Public high schools in Florida
Magnet schools in Florida
International Baccalaureate schools in Florida